Edson is a town in west-central Alberta, Canada.

History 
The town was founded as Heatherwood, but the name was changed around 1911 in honour of Edson Joseph Chamberlin, vice-president of the Grand Trunk Pacific Railway. When Edson was declared the local rail centre, smaller communities such as Rosevear (abandoned), Wolf Creek, Carrot Creek and Niton Junction fell into a decline that continues today. In the 1950s, upgrading of Highway 16 caused a dramatic increase in private, commercial and industrial traffic. Today, the Yellowhead Highway carries some of the heaviest traffic flow in Alberta and has been declared the second Trans-Canada Highway. In the 1970s, a revitalized coal industry launched the Cardinal River Coal and Luscar Sterco mines in the area. In the 1980s Pelican Spruce Mills (now Weyerhaeuser Company Limited) and Sundance Forest Industries (now Edson Forest Products a division of West Fraser Mills Ltd.) became two of Edson's major employers. The former hamlets of Glenwood and Grande Prairie Trail were annexed from Yellowhead County by the Town of Edson on 1 January 1984.

Demographics 

In the 2016 Census of Population conducted by Statistics Canada, the Town of Edson recorded a population of 8,414 living in 3,359 of its 3,762 total private dwellings, a  change from its 2011 population of 8,475.

The Town of Edson's 2012 municipal census counted a population of 8,646.

Geography 
Edson lies in the McLeod River valley, immediately east of the Canadian Rockies foothills. The surrounding landscape consists of primarily taiga forest with sand hills and muskeg. Two provincial parks are located west of Edson: Sundance Provincial Park along Sundance Creek and Obed Lake Provincial Park surrounding the three Obed Lakes.

Climate 
Due to Edson's high elevation, the community experiences a subarctic climate (Köppen climate classification Dfc). Summers in Edson are generally mild to warm with chilly nights and moderate precipitation. Winters are long and severely cold with relatively high snowfall, higher than surrounding areas due to the town's high elevation.

Economy 
The main industries that drive the local economy are resource based – coal, oil, natural gas and forestry products.

Sports 
Edson was home to Canada's largest slo-pitch tournament until 2017.

Infrastructure 
Edson is connected to the Yellowhead Highway from east to west and to Coal Valley via Highway 47 to the south.

Via Rail's The Canadian calls at the Edson railway station three times per week in each direction as a flag stop.

Education 
Grande Yellowhead Public School Division No. 77
 Mary Bergeron Elementary School (K-5)
 Parkland Composite High School (9-12 English, French)
 École Pine Grove Middle School (6-8 English, French)
 Westhaven Elementary School (K-5 English, French)

Living Waters Catholic Regional Division No. 42
 Holy Redeemer Junior Senior Catholic High School (7-12)
 Vanier Community Catholic School (K-6)

Private
 Yellowhead Koinonia Christian School (K-12)

Media 
Newspapers
Edson has one weekly paper, The Weekly Anchor, published every Monday. A second paper, Edson Leader, was established in 1911 before ceasing publication in 2020.

Radio stations
CBXD 1540 CBC Radio One
CFXE 94.3 Newcap Broadcasting
CKUA-FM-8 103.7 CKUA Radio Network

Coat of Arms 
On 15 October 2019, the town was granted a coat of arms by the Canadian Heraldic Authority, while the announcement of the Letters Patent was made on 28 March 2020, in Volume 154, page 692 of the Canada Gazette.

Notable people 
George VanderBurg, Canadian politician, Progressive Conservative MLA (2001-2013)

In popular culture
 In the 2020 Netflix Original series [[Into the Night (TV series)|Into the Night]]'', a plane flying west in an attempt to survive a catastrophic solar event that kills all living organisms during daylight hours, lands in Edson during Episode 2.

 Below Zero (2011) was filmed in and around Edson

 Television series Hellfire Heroes (2018) was partially filmed in Edson

See also 
Edson Airport
List of communities in Alberta
List of towns in Alberta

References

External links 

 
1911 establishments in Alberta
Towns in Alberta